Baabe is a municipality in the Vorpommern-Rügen district in Mecklenburg-Vorpommern, Germany.

Sights 

 Baaber Bollwerk viewing point
 Thatched houses
 Mönchgut Coastal Fishing Museum
 Baabe Village Church

At the northern exit from the village runs the Mönchgraben, the remnants of a medieval boundary ditch.

References

External links

Official website of Baabe
Baabe at Amt Mönchgut-Granitz

Towns and villages on Rügen
Mönchgut
Populated coastal places in Germany (Baltic Sea)